Rožňava (Latin: Rosnavia) is a town in Slovakia, approximately  by road from Košice in the Košice Region, and has a population of 19,182.

The town is an economic and tourist centre of the Gemer. Rožňava is now a popular tourist attraction with a beautiful historic town centre. The town is an episcopal seat. It has above all food, textile and remnants of mining industries.

History
Archaeological finds show that the region was densely settled by miners as early as around 1200. The first written mention stems from 1291, the royal free town status from 1410. The Roman Catholic diocese of Rozsnyó was founded in 1776.

In the Middle Ages, Rozsnyó was a prosperous mining town for gold, silver, and iron. Mining activities stagnated from the 16th century (when territories to the south of the town were conquered by Ottoman Turks). Mining - this time mainly of iron ore - was renewed around 1800 and was present in the town throughout the 20th century. It was ruled by Ottoman Empire as part of Filek sanjak (Its centre was Rimaszombat) during periods of 1554-1593 and 1596-1686. It was known as "Rojna" during Ottoman period.

The name of the town probably derives from the German word for rose (Rose, in the German name of the town "Rosenau").
Until 1920 it was part of Gömör és Kishont County of the Kingdom of Hungary, and again from 1938 to 1945.

During World War II, Rožňava was captured on 23 January 1945 by troops of the Romanian 4th Army, acting as a part of the Soviet 2nd Ukrainian Front.

On 13 September 2003, Rožňava was visited by Pope John Paul II.

Noteworthy buildings
 an important Mining Museum
 a completely preserved medieval central town square with burgher houses
 the Cathedral (Gothic, late 13th century) with many precious historic art objects, especially a Renaissance painting of Mestercia showing realistic mining motifs, as well as the body of St. Neith, a catacombs Saint. 
 the Town Tower (Renaissance, 1654) in the middle of the central town square
 the Jesuit church (Baroque, 1687)
 the Bishop's residence (Baroque-Classical, arose 1778 from older houses) with  a plague column in front of the building
 a town hall (Classical, 1711)
 an Evangelic Lutheran church (Classical, 1786)
 a Reformed church (neo-Gothic, 1905)

Demographics
According to the 2001 census, the town had 19,261 inhabitants. 69.27% of inhabitants were Slovaks, 26.80% Hungarians, 1.59% Roma and 0.69% Czechs. The religious make-up was 41.08% Roman Catholics, 32.34% people with no religious affiliation, 12.03% Lutherans and 1.33% Greek Catholics. According to the 2021 census, its inhabitants were 70.36% Slovak, 18.77% Hungarian, 0.95% Roma and 0.36% Czech; the remaining 9.56% inhabitants were of other groups.

Notable citizens
 Haviva Reik, Jewish resistance fighter
 Pavel Jozef Šafárik, poet and philologist.
 Vladimir Oravsky, writer, director
 Martin Simon, composer and guitarist
 Adam Szentpétery, artist.
 Dana Velďáková, triple jumper
 Jana Velďáková, long jumper
 Henrieta Farkašová, gold medal winner at the 2010 Winter Paralympics and at 2014 Sochi Paralympics

Parts of the town
 Nadabula
 Rožňavská Baňa (Rožňava Mine)

Twin towns — sister cities

Rožňava is twinned with:
 Bačka Topola, Serbia
 Český Těšín, Czech Republic
 Cieszyn, Poland
 Lipótváros (Budapest), Hungary
 Szerencs, Hungary

References
Notes

External links
 
  
 Rožňava
 Information on Rožňava and the Gemer region
 Information on tourist sights (with photo of the main square)
 Medial information site about life in Rožňava (in Slovak)

Cities and towns in Slovakia
Geography of Košice Region
Hungarian communities in Slovakia